On July 21, 2021, three boats sank on the first day of Eid-ul-Adha in the Raghagan Dam in Bajaur, killing four people and leaving 20 missing.

The first sinking boat of tourists who went to the dam to have a picnic on the occasion of Eid had 18 people on board. The second boat went to rescue it and it also sank. Then the third boat went to rescue the people in both boats and it also sank. Rescue boats carrying seven people have also drowned. The bodies of four people aboard the boat have been recovered while four people were rescued alive, including three children, who were rushed to hospital in critical condition. According to rescue officials, 20 people are missing and a rescue operation is underway to find them.

People in Raghgan Bazaar also protested against the incident which took place due to poor arrangements in Raghgan Dam.

See alos
 Tanda Dam incident

References

2021 in Pakistan
Bajaur District
Boating accident deaths
Deaths by drowning
July 2021 events in Pakistan